1621 Druzhba, provisional designation , is a stony Florian asteroid and relatively slow rotator from the inner regions of the asteroid belt, approximately 10 kilometers in diameter. It was discovered on 1 October 1926, by Russian astronomer Sergey Belyavsky at Simeiz Observatory on the Crimean peninsula. It was named after the Russian word for friendship.

Classification and orbit 

Druzhba is a member of the Flora family, one of the largest collisional groups of stony asteroids in the main-belt. It orbits the Sun at a distance of 2.0–2.5 AU once every 3 years and 4 months (1,216 days). Its orbit has an eccentricity of 0.12 and an inclination of 3° with respect to the ecliptic. Druzhbas observation arc begins at the discovering observatory, one week after its official discovery observation.

Physical characteristics 

In the Tholen classification, Druzhba is a common S-type asteroid.

Rotation period 

In August 2009, American amateur astronomer Robert D. Stephens obtained a rotational lightcurve of Druzhba from photometric observations. In gave a well-defined rotation period of 99.20 hours with a change in brightness of 0.75	 magnitude A 2016-published modeled light-curve of 99.100 hours concurred with the result.

This makes it a relatively slow rotator, as the vast majority of minor planets rotate every 2 to 20 hours around their axis. Druzhbas long rotation period was particularly difficulty to measure: Previously, observations by Richard Ditteon at Oakley Observatory gave a period solution of 47.9 hours (Δmag 1.0), while Polish astronomer Wiesław Wiśniewski obtained a period of only 12 hours in the late 1980s (Δmag 0.16).

Diameter and albedo 

According to the surveys carried out by the Infrared Astronomical Satellite IRAS, the Japanese Akari satellite, and NASA's Wide-field Infrared Survey Explorer with its subsequent NEOWISE mission, Druzhba measures between 9.08 and 12.69 kilometers in diameter, and its surface has an albedo between 0.237 and 0.312.

Based on an absolute magnitude of 12.37, the Collaborative Asteroid Lightcurve Link derives a diameter of 9.05 kilometers and an albedo of 0.243 – similar to the albedo of 8 Flora, the family's largest member and namesake.

Naming 

This minor planet was named Druzhba, this is a Slavic word for friendship and the name of several cities, towns and other localities in Russia, Ukraine, Bulgaria and Kazakhstan. The asteroid's name was proposed by the Institute of Theoretical Astronomy in St. Petersburg. The official  was published by the Minor Planet Center on 1 June 1967.

References

External links 
 Asteroid Lightcurve Database (LCDB), query form (info )
 Dictionary of Minor Planet Names, Google books
 Asteroids and comets rotation curves, CdR – Observatoire de Genève, Raoul Behrend
 Discovery Circumstances: Numbered Minor Planets (1)-(5000) – Minor Planet Center
 
 

001621
Discoveries by Sergei Belyavsky
Named minor planets
001621
19261001